Ollamh Connachta was the highest professional level recognised for a poet, historian or lawyer within the province.

Annals

 1413:Be Binn, daughter of Maelsechlainn son of Muirgius Mac Donnchada and wife of Master Matha Mac in Oclaig, died.
 1416:Tomas Mac ind Oclaig, erenagh of Killery and chief master of Law in Connacht, died after a victory of repentance.

See also

 Ollamh Érenn
 Ollamh Clanricarde - 1438.3:Conchobar Mac Aedacain, ollav of Macwilliam of Clanrickard, died.
 Ollamh Ui Fiachrach - 1414:Donnchad Mac Fir Bisig, prospective ollav of the Ui Fiachrach Muaide, died this year.

Sources

The Encyclopaedia of Ireland 2003; .
 Mac Dermot of Moylurg: The Story of a Connacht Family Dermot Mac Dermot, 1996.
A New History of Ireland VIII: A Chronology of Irish History to 1976 - A Companion to Irish History Part I edited by T.W. Moody, F.X. Martin and F.J. Byrne, 1982. 
The Celebrated Antiquary Nollaig O Muralie, Maynooth, 1996. 
Irish Leaders and Learning Through the Ages Fr. Paul Walsh, 2004. (ed. Nollaig O Muralie).

External links
List of Published Texts at CELT — University College Cork's Corpus of Electronic Texts

Irish chroniclers
Medieval Irish poets
Medieval Irish historians
Irish male poets